Senator Dale may refer to:

Charles M. Dale (1893–1978), New Hampshire State Senate
George N. Dale (1834–1903), Vermont State Senate
Porter H. Dale (1867–1933), U.S. Senator for Vermont from 1923 to 1933